The Tyree Building, at 679 Durant Pl., NE, in Atlanta, Georgia, was built in 1915–16.  It was listed on the National Register of Historic Places in 1982.  It was designed by architect Haralson Bleckley and was one of the earliest garden apartments buildings in Atlanta.

The Tyree is one of the first buildings in Atlanta built in the Beaux-Arts style of architecture. Only a few out of many Atlanta apartment buildings designed by Bleckley have survived.

References

Apartment buildings
National Register of Historic Places in Atlanta
National Register of Historic Places in Fulton County, Georgia
Buildings and structures completed in 1915
Beaux-Arts architecture in Georgia (U.S. state)